The 1840–41 United States House of Representatives elections were held on various dates in various states between  July 6, 1840 and November 2, 1841. Each state set its own date for its elections to the House of Representatives, before or after the first session of the 27th United States Congress convened on May 31, 1841. Elections were held for all 242 seats, representing 26 states.

In a Whig wave, voters gave the Whig Party a House majority for the first time.  Most Americans experienced the Panic of 1837 as a severe economic downturn.  Its perceived mishandling by Democratic President Martin Van Buren fueled new support for alternative economic policies favored by Whigs of which voters had previously been skeptical. Collapse of the Anti-Masonic Party in the late 1830s also drove some third-party incumbents into the Whig Party. Newly elected members included Robert M. T. Hunter, Independent of Virginia, and Zadok Casey, Independent Democrat of Illinois.

Election summaries

The previous election had two minor parties, the Anti-Masonic Party with 6 seats and the Conservative Party (of Virginia) with 2 seats, both of which disappeared in this election.

The 1st session of the 27th Congress began May 31, 1841, before Mississippi had elected Representatives, leaving that State unrepresented until the 2nd session.

Special elections

26th Congress 

 : 1840
 : January 1841 (one of the at-large seat)
 : 1840
 : 1840
 : 1840
 : 1840
 : 1840

27th Congress 

 : 1841
 : 1841
 : 1841
 : 1841
 : 1841
  (again): 1841
 : 1841

|-
! 
| Francis Granger
|  | Whig
| 1838
|  | Incumbent resigned March 5, 1841 to become U.S. Postmaster General.New member elected May 13, 1841.Whig hold.Successor seated May 21, 1841.
| nowrap | 

|-
! 
| John Greig
|  | Whig
| 1841 
|  | Incumbent resigned September 25, 1841.New member elected November 3, 1841.Whig hold.Successor seated November 27, 1841.
| nowrap | 

|-
! rowspan=3 | 
| William C. Dawson
|  | Whig
| 1836 
|  | Incumbent resigned November 13, 1841 to run for Governor of Georgia.New member elected December 21, 1841.Democratic gain.
| rowspan=3 nowrap | 

|-
| Eugenius A. Nisbet
|  | Whig
| 1838
|  | Incumbent resigned October 12, 1841.New member elected December 21, 1841.Democratic gain.

|-
| Julius Caesar Alford
|  | Whig
| 1838
|  | Incumbent resigned October 1, 1841.New member elected December 21, 1841.Democratic gain.

|}

Alabama

Arkansas

Connecticut

Delaware

Florida Territory 
See Non-voting delegates, below.

Georgia

Illinois

Indiana

Iowa Territory 
See Non-voting delegates, below.

Kentucky

Louisiana

Maine 

Maine elected its members September 14, 1840.

|-
! 

|-
! 

|-
! 

|-
! 

|-
! 

|-
! 

|-
! 

|-
! 
| Thomas Davee
|  | Democratic 
| 1836
|  | Incumbent retired.New member elected.Whig gain.
| nowrap | 

|}

Maryland

Massachusetts 
Massachusetts held its elections November 9, 1840, but one district went to a second ballot on January 4, 1841.

|-
! 

|-
! 

|-
! 

|-
! 
| William Parmenter
|  | Democratic
| 1836
| Incumbent re-elected.
| nowrap | 

|-
! 

|-
! 

|-
! 

|-
! 

|-
! 

|-
! 
| Henry Williams
|  | Democratic
| 1838
|  | Incumbent lost re-election.New member elected on the second ballot.Whig gain.
| nowrap | 

|-
! 

|-
! 
| John Quincy Adams
|  | Whig
| 1830
| Incumbent re-elected.
| nowrap | 

|}

Mississippi  

Elections held late, from November 1 to 2, 1841.

|-
! rowspan=2 | (2 seats)
| Jacob Thompson
|  | Democratic
| 1839
| Incumbent re-elected.
| nowrap rowspan=2 | 
|-
| Albert G. Brown
|  | Democratic
| 1839
|  | Incumbent retired.New member elected.Democratic hold.

|}

Michigan  

|-
! 
| Isaac E. Crary
| 
| 1835
|  | Incumbent retired.New member elected.Whig gain.
| nowrap | 

|}

Missouri

New Hampshire

New Jersey

North Carolina

New York

Ohio

Pennsylvania

Rhode Island

South Carolina

Tennessee 
Elections held late, on May 6, 1841.

|-
! 
| William B. Carter
|  | Whig
| 1835
|  |Incumbent retired.New member elected.Whig hold.
| nowrap | 

|-
! 
| Abraham McClellan
|  | Democratic
| 1837
| Incumbent re-elected.
| nowrap | 

|-
! 
| Joseph L. Williams
|  | Whig
| 1837
| Incumbent re-elected.
| nowrap | 

|-
! 
| Julius W. Blackwell
|  | Democratic
| 1839
|  |Incumbent lost re-election.New member elected.Whig gain.
| nowrap | 

|-
! 
| Hopkins L. Turney
|  | Democratic
| 1837
| Incumbent re-elected.
| nowrap | 

|-
! 
| William B. Campbell
|  | Whig
| 1837
| Incumbent re-elected.
| nowrap | 

|-
! 
| John Bell
|  | Whig
| 1827
|  |Incumbent retired to become Secretary of War.New member elected.Whig hold.
| nowrap | 

|-
! 
| Meredith P. Gentry
|  | Whig
| 1839
| Incumbent re-elected.
| nowrap | 

|-
! 
| Harvey M. Watterson
|  | Democratic
| 1839 
| Incumbent re-elected.
| nowrap | 

|-
! 
| Aaron V. Brown
|  | Democratic
| 1839
| Incumbent re-elected.
| nowrap | 

|-
! 
| Cave Johnson
|  | Democratic
| 1839 
| Incumbent re-elected.
| nowrap | 

|-
! 
| John W. Crockett
|  | Whig
| 1837 
|  |Incumbent retired to become Attorney General for the 9th district.New member elected.Whig hold.
| nowrap | 

|-
! 
| Christopher H. Williams
|  | Whig
| 1837 
| Incumbent re-elected.
| nowrap | 

|}

Vermont

Virginia

Wisconsin Territory 
See Non-voting delegates, below.

Non-voting delegates

26th Congress 

|-
! 
| William W. Chapman
|  | Democratic
| 1838
|  | Incumbent's term expired by law.New delegate elected in 1840.Democratic hold.
| nowrap | 

|}

27th Congress 

|-
! 
| Charles Downing
|  | Democratic
| 1836
| Incumbent re-elected on an unknown date.
| nowrap | 

|-
! 
| Augustus C. Dodge
|  | Democratic
| 1840
| Incumbent re-elected August 6, 1841.
| nowrap | 

|-
! 
| James D. Doty
|  | Democratic
| 1838
| Incumbent re-elected on an unknown date.
| nowrap | 

|}

See also
 1840 United States elections
 List of United States House of Representatives elections (1824–1854)
 1840 United States presidential election
 1840–41 United States Senate elections
 26th United States Congress
 27th United States Congress

Notes

References

Bibliography

External links
 Office of the Historian (Office of Art & Archives, Office of the Clerk, U.S. House of Representatives)